Tenellia futairo is a species of sea slug, an aeolid nudibranch, a marine gastropod mollusc in the family Fionidae.

Distribution
This species was described from Mukaishima, Inland Sea of Seto, Japan. Also reported from Mutsu Bay, Sagami Bay; Sugashima near Toba, Osaka Bay, Saeki Bay, Amakusa and Toyama Bay in the original description.

Description 
The typical adult size of this species is 10 mm. The body is pale orange-yellow with the tips of the oral tentacles and rhinophores deeper orange-yellow. The oral tentacles have a longitudinal opaque white band on the posterior side. The cerata have an opaque white mark below the tip on the outer surface.

References 

Fionidae
Gastropods described in 1963